Pan Tadeusz is a 1928 Polish historical film, based on Adam Mickiewicz's 1834 poem of the same name. The film was long considered lost, until the vast majoritiy of it was found in 2006.

Cast
Wojciech Brydziński as Adam Mickiewicz 
Stanisław Knake-Zawadzki as Sędzia Soplica 
Jan Szymański - Jacek Soplica (priest Robak)
Mariusz Maszyński as  Hrabia Horeszko 
Leon Łuszczewski − Tadeusz Soplica
Helena Sulimowa − Telimena
Zofia Zajączkowska as Zosia Horeszkówna 
Paweł Owerłło as Podkomorzy 
Helena Górska-Brylinska as Podkomorzyna 
Rena Hryniewiczówna as Podkomorzanka 
Wiesław Gawlikowski as Wojski 
Janina Klimkiewiczowa as Wojszczanka 
Marian Jednowski as Gerwazy 
Ludwik Fritsche as Protazy 
Stefan Jaracz as Napoleon Bonaparte 
Jerzy Marr as Stanislaw Szczesny Potocki 
Henryk Rzętkowski as Sergeant Gonta

References

External links
 
 Ryszard Ordyński's 1928 production of Pan Tadeusz, Culture.pl

1928 films
Polish historical films
1920s Polish-language films
Polish silent films
Polish black-and-white films
1920s historical films